Mariano Garau (1952) is an Italian contemporary composer.

Born in Iglesias, he soon approached music as a small singer under the guidance of the composer Pietro Allori, Maestro di Cappella in the Cathedral of Iglesias. He studied Harmony and Counterpoint with Maestro Rodolfo Cicionesi of Florence.
He is an author of romances for Soprano, Tenor, children's songs, Masses and Motets for choir.
For the Amnesty International Association he wrote a piece for the chorus of white voices, inserted in the DVD "TAPES OF WORDS FOR GIRTH ROUND OF PEACE", officially presented in Sassari on December 17, 2012.
With the "Editrice ARES" (Verona) and "Tagliabue Editore" he publishes the files: "Nel mio canto la sua lode", "Armonie di Natale”, “La Preghiera del Carabiniere” “Messa Giovanni Paolo II” and other songs for the liturgy.
He created the musical part on the lyrics of  Natalia Di Bartolo.
The Swiss publishing house “SYMPAPHONIE” and Les Éditions À Cœur Joie publish some of his choral pages. For the "Philadelphia International Opera Theater" writes the Cantata "Hildegard vonBingen: Mystical Child" based on a libretto by Karen Saillant performed in world premiere in Assisi, in collaboration with the "Assisi Suono Sacro" Cultural Association; the Opera was repeated in America in November 2015.
In 2016, Maestro Mariano Garau received the request for a new "Cantata su Hildegard", which was performed in the "Basilica Superiore San Francesco di Assisi" on August 6. The new work, entitled"Hildegard Von Bingen Mystical Child and The Black Virgin", will be repeated on October 15 at the Our Lady of Czestochowa in Doylestown in Pennsylvania, on the occasion of the 50th anniversary of the sanctification of that church, the largest in the United States dedicated to the Black Madonna.
And on October 23 at The Church of the Advocate in Philadelphia.
On August 6, 2017, in Città della Pieve, his recent work “I bambini di Fatima e il miracolo del sole” is represented 
His compositions are performed by choirs from all over the world:
Italy, United States, Australia, France, Argentina, Brazil, Slovenia, Holland, Hungary, Latvia, Spain, Germany, South Korea, Japan, China, Switzerland, Poland, England, Portugal, Ireland, Romania, South America, South Africa , Czech Republic, Belgium, Peru, Mexico, Canada, Norway.

Recordings
Polifonia Sacra – Cappella Musicale Pietro Allori 
I misteri della passione
Madre nostra
, performed by the University Choir of Pingtung (China)
, performed by "Cappella Musicale Pietro Allori" (Italy)
, performed by "Cappella Musicale Pietro Allori" (Italy)
, performed by "Cappella Musicale Pietro Allori" (Italy)

References

External links

Italian male composers
20th-century Italian composers
21st-century composers
1952 births
Living people
20th-century Italian male musicians
21st-century Italian male musicians